The Toyma (Tuyma) is a river in Udmurtia and Tatarstan, Russian Federation, a right-bank tributary of the Kama. It begins in Udmurtia and falls to the Kama near Yelabuga, Tatarstan.

Major tributaries are the Vozzhayka, Yurashka, Karinka rivers. Drainage is regulated. Since 1978 it is protected as a natural monument of Tatarstan. Mendeleyevsk and Yelabuga are along the river.

References 

Rivers of Tatarstan
Rivers of Udmurtia